Gaetano Michetti (3 March 1922 – 13 December 2007) was the bishop of the Roman Catholic Diocese of Pesaro in Italy. Appointed by Pope John XXIII in July 1975, he served until 3 January 1998.

Biography 

Born in Corridonia in 1922, Michetti was ordained as a Catholic priest on 8 August 1948. He was appointed Auxiliary bishop of Fermo on 31 May 1961 and was ordained titular Bishop of Irenopilis in Cilicia on 15 August 1961. He was council father during the four sessions of Second Vatican Council.

He was appointed coadjutor bishop of Pesaro on 7 July 1973, and installed as bishop after monsignor Luigi Borromeo's death, on 4 July 1975.

Bishop Gaetano Michetti died on 13 December 2007, at the age of 85.

References

External links
Profile of Mons. Michetti www.catholic-hierarchy.org
Official Page of diocese of Pesaro

1922 births
Bishops and archbishops of Pesaro
20th-century Italian Roman Catholic bishops
2007 deaths
People from the Province of Macerata